Defending champion Serena Williams defeated her sister Venus Williams in a rematch of the previous year's final, 4–6, 6–4, 6–2 to win the ladies' singles tennis title at the 2003 Wimbledon Championships. It was her second Wimbledon singles title and her sixth major singles title overall.

This was the first Wimbledon appearance of future world No. 1 and five-time major champion Maria Sharapova, who lost to Svetlana Kuznetsova in the fourth round. Sharapova would win the title the following year. It was also the first Wimbledon appearance of future champion Marion Bartoli, who lost to Daniela Hantuchová in the first round. The semifinals featured the top four seeds, which last occurred in 1995.

This was the first major since the 1987 Australian Open to not feature either Monica Seles, Steffi Graf, or Arantxa Sánchez Vicario.

Seeds

  Serena Williams (champion)
  Kim Clijsters (semifinals)
  Justine Henin-Hardenne (semifinals)
  Venus Williams (final)
  Lindsay Davenport (quarterfinals)
  Amélie Mauresmo (withdrew)
  Chanda Rubin (third round)
  Jennifer Capriati (quarterfinals)
  Daniela Hantuchová (second round)
  Anastasia Myskina (fourth round)
  Jelena Dokić (third round)
  Magdalena Maleeva (second round)
  Ai Sugiyama (fourth round)
  Eleni Daniilidou (second round)
  Elena Dementieva (fourth round)
  Vera Zvonareva (fourth round)
  Amanda Coetzer (second round)
  Conchita Martínez (third round)
  Meghann Shaughnessy (first round)
  Patty Schnyder (first round)
  Elena Bovina (second round)
  Nathalie Dechy (third round)
  Lisa Raymond (third round)
  Magüi Serna (second round)
  Anna Pistolesi (first round)
  Alexandra Stevenson (first round)
  Silvia Farina Elia (quarterfinals)
  Laura Granville (third round)
  Nadia Petrova (third round)
  Denisa Chládková (second round)
  Elena Likhovtseva (second round)
  Tamarine Tanasugarn (first round)
  Svetlana Kuznetsova (quarterfinals)

Amélie Mauresmo withdrew due to a rib injury. She was replaced in the draw by the highest-ranked non-seeded player Svetlana Kuznetsova, who became the #33 seed.

Qualifying

Draw

Finals

Top half

Section 1

Section 2

Section 3

Section 4

Bottom half

Section 5

Section 6

Section 7

Section 8

References

External links

2003 Wimbledon Championships on WTAtennis.com
2003 Wimbledon Championships – Women's draws and results at the International Tennis Federation

Women's Singles
Wimbledon Championship by year – Women's singles
Wimbledon Championships
Wimbledon Championships